Temko Popov (Cyrillic: Темко Попов) was a pro-Macedonian activist and Serbian national worker in the Ottoman Empire. He espoused in his youth, according to Bulgarian historians, a kind of Macedonian pro-Serbian identity. Per Serbian historians this kind of vague identity was used by Serbian politicians as a counterweight to Bulgarian influence and was turned later into Serbian nationalism.

Life
Popov was born in Ohrid, then in the Ottoman Empire. He graduated from high school in Athens, Greece. In Athens he worked in various Orthodox agencies. Then Temko worked as a teacher in Edirne and afterwards in the Bulgarian Men's High School of Bitola. Subsequently, he moved to Sofia, Bulgaria, where he was among the founders of the secret Macedonian Society established in 1886 to promote some kind of pro-Serbian Macedonian identity, distinguished especially from the ethnic identity of the Bulgarians. The other leaders were Naum Evrov, Kosta Grupčev and Vasilij Karajovev.

Chased by the Bulgarian authorities in late August 1886, they moved to Belgrade, where they led negotiations with the Serbian government on the Macedonian issue, and participated in the formation of the Association of Serbo-Macedonians the same year. At that time “Macedonism” was seen by the Serbian government as a possible counterweight to Bulgarian influence in Macedonia and as a stage to the gradual Serbianisation of the Macedonian Slavs. From Belgrade, he was sent by the Serbian authorities in Thessaloniki, where he was infiltrated to work into the Bulgarian high school. However, in 1887 he was expelled from there because of his pro-Serbian propaganda. In 1888 in a letter to Despot Badžović, Temko Popov emphasized the most important aim: to Macedonize the Macedonian Slavs. In the same letter he stated:
 
This activities of Popov had been criticized by the Bulgarian intelligentsia in Macedonia. On this occasion, Kuzman Shapkarev wrote in a letter to Marin Drinov in 1888 that "One freak - Temko Popov, illegitimate son of Stefan Vladikov - the traitor of Dimitar Miladinov, lies to the Serbian consul in Tsarigrad (Stojan Novaković), that he would turn the Macedonian Bulgarians into Old Serbs".
Temko moved back to Belgrade where the Saint Sava society helped him materially to his new assignment at work. This compromise with the Serbian interests led him later to abandonment of his separatist program altogether. Subsequently, from 1888 to 1913 Temko was on Serbian diplomatic service consistently in Thessaloniki, Istanbul and Athens. As result since the eve of the new century, he and his collaborators promoted only pro-Serbian ideas. After the Young Turk Revolution, Temko became a Serbian senator to the Ottoman parliament in 1908–09, when he lived in Constantinople. Here he issued the Serbian newspaper "Carigradski glasnik". Later he worked in the Serbian Embassy in Athens until the end of the Balkan Wars in 1913. Then he moved to Ohrid, just ceded to Serbia, and became its mayor until the Bulgarian occupation in 1915. In 1918 after World War I he served as the mayor of Ohrid for second time. In 1921 Popov was appointed inspector in Agricultural service in Bitola, where he retired.

References

Sources

19th-century Serbian people
20th-century Serbian people
Serbs of North Macedonia
People of the Macedonian Struggle
Serbian diplomats
Early Macedonists
Serbian educators
People from Ohrid
Serbs from the Ottoman Empire
Ottoman period in the history of North Macedonia
1855 births
1929 deaths